An expansion valve is a valve used for different purposes:

Steam engines 

A valve used to control the expansion of steam:

 Expansion valve (steam engine)
 The best-known of these was the Meyer expansion valve, the invention of Jean-Jacques Meyer

Thermodynamics 

A valve used to expand a gas, for thermodynamic cooling purposes in either:

 Joule-Thomson cooler
 heat pump

Also 
 Thermal expansion valve, a component in refrigeration and air conditioning systems